Mauro Antunes Eustáquio (born 10 February 1993) is a Canadian soccer coach and former professional player who played as a midfielder. He is as an assistant coach with York United of the Canadian Premier League.

Born in Portugal, he represented Canada at international level.

Early life
Eustáquio was born in Nazaré, Leiria District, and moved to Leamington, Ontario when he was 13 months old. He returned to Portugal at the age of 11, and spent time in the youth academies of Grupo Desportivo Os Nazarenos and U.D. Leiria.

Eustáquio started his senior career in 2012, with fourth division club Sporting Clube Pombal.

Club career

Ottawa Fury
On 20 December 2013, Eustáquio signed with North American Soccer League club Ottawa Fury FC. He made his debut on 2 August 2014 as a replacement starter for injured captain Richie Ryan in a 2–1 away loss against Minnesota United FC, and finished the season with eight appearances.

Eustáquio featured significantly the following campaign, playing 23 times across all competitions including twice in the team's run in the Soccer Bowl. He scored his first goal for them on 8 August 2015 in a 4–1 win over the Indy Eleven on 8 August 2015, earning a place on the league's Team of the Week; he added a second on 18 October, helping the hosts defeat the San Antonio Scorpions 1–0, and later in the year he agreed to a contract extension.

Eustáquio nearly went on loan to FC Edmonton during the 2016 season in exchange for Mallan Roberts, however the move fell through. In December, the Fury announced that the former would not return to the club as it was due to move to the United Soccer League.

FC Edmonton
On 14 February 2017, Eustáquio joined FC Edmonton. On 24 November, after the club ceased operations, he left.

Penn FC
In February 2018, Eustáquio signed with Penn FC of the USL. In June, he suffered a knee injury that would sideline him for the rest of the season.

Cavalry FC
On 20 March 2019, Eustáquio moved to the Canadian Premier League after agreeing to a contract at Cavalry FC. He played ten league matches for the side in the inaugural campaign of the competition.

Caldas
Eustáquio joined Caldas S.C. of the Portuguese third tier on 21 July 2020. He announced his retirement on 7 April 2021 at the age of 28.

Coaching career
Immediately after his retirement, Eustáquio joined the coaching staff of Calgary Foothills FC as development phase boys manager. In February 2022, he was named assistant at Canadian Premier League club York United FC.

Personal life
Eustáquio's younger brother, Stephen, is also a footballer. A midfielder as well, he represented Portugal at under-21 level and the Canadian senior team.

Career statistics

Honours
Ottawa Fury
North American Soccer League: 2015 Fall Championship

References

External links

1993 births
Living people
People from Nazaré, Portugal
People from Leamington, Ontario
Canadian people of Portuguese descent
Portuguese emigrants to Canada
Naturalized citizens of Canada
Sportspeople from Leiria District
Soccer people from Ontario
Canadian soccer players
Portuguese footballers
Association football midfielders
North American Soccer League players
USL Championship players
Ottawa Fury FC players
FC Edmonton players
Penn FC players
Canadian Premier League players
Cavalry FC players
Campeonato de Portugal (league) players
S.C. Pombal players
U.D. Leiria players
Caldas S.C. players
Canada men's youth international soccer players
Canada men's under-23 international soccer players
Canadian expatriate soccer players
Portuguese expatriate footballers
Expatriate soccer players in the United States
Canadian expatriate sportspeople in the United States
Portuguese expatriate sportspeople in the United States
York United FC non-playing staff